Siblyback Lake is a reservoir on the edge of Bodmin Moor in Cornwall, England, UK.

It is one of 12 areas in Cornwall designated as an Area of Outstanding Natural Beauty. and is managed by the South-West Lakes Trust.

The dam blocks a small tributary of the River Fowey. It was built in 1968 and at full capacity the lake holds over 3 billion litres of water. The reservoir is used to buffer the water levels in the River Fowey in the summer. The water is collected downstream for domestic drinking water at the Restormel treatment works.

In addition to watersports facilities, a  circular path runs adjacent to the lake.

The lake has a resident population of brown trout and is regularly stocked with rainbow trout and blue trout.

Gallery

References

Reservoirs in Cornwall